Horizontal and vertical integration may refer to:
 Horizontal integration
 Vertical integration